Wangaratta railway station is located on the North East line in Victoria, Australia. It serves the town of Wangaratta, and it opened on 28 October 1873.

History

Wangaratta opened on 28 October 1873, as the temporary terminus of the line from Benalla, before it was extended to Wodonga on 21 November 1873.

A goods shed is located across from the main platform, but has no siding, with the goods shed office itself demolished in 1978. Dock platforms were also once located at both ends of the station. Wangaratta was once the junction for the Whitfield  narrow gauge railway line. Footbridges are located at both the south end of the platform and over the northern end of the yard.

The main platform and station building is located to the east of the standard gauge "West" line. The original standard gauge line runs in a concrete walled cutting, located between the station and adjoining street, with a number of bridges crossing this cutting to provide station access (this cutting was completed by mid-1960). The platform on the standard gauge "East" line is located in the cutting at the Melbourne end of the station. Alumatta Loop was located to the south of the station on the standard gauge line, past the Sisely Avenue level crossing. In February 2011, the loop was booked out of use, and was removed shortly afterwards.

Initial facilities included a goods shed and a temporary station building. A brick station building, identical to that at Benalla, was erected in 1874, with a two storied brick tower added to the Melbourne end in 1897. The large signal box was provided in 1887, and then extended in 1908, when the goods yard was enlarged, and the current goods shed provided.

The narrow gauge Whitfield line opened in 1899, branching off from the main line at the southern end of the station. The line closed in 1953.

When the standard gauge line was constructed through the station in 1962, extensive works were required to thread it through the narrow railway reserve. The locomotive depot and turntable were relocated from the east side of the line to the west side of the line, and new grade separations were provided at Rowan Street, to the north, and Roy Street, to the south. A few years later, in 1965, siding "D" was abolished.

In 1973, minor modifications occurred in the station building. In 1977, the oil siding at the station was abolished.

During 1984, the passenger facilities in the main station building were refurbished. The upgraded facilities re-opened on 9 November of the same year.

In 1989, the cattle siding and siding "F" was abolished. Further sidings were abolished in 1992, including sidings "C" and "J", as well as a number of dead end extensions and a number of points.

During June/July 1997, the signal box at Wangaratta was abolished. Signalling and interlocked points were also abolished during this time.

In 1998, former New South Wales regional passenger operator CountryLink rebuilt the standard gauge platform. The works included replacing the original deck with a steel deck covered with a concrete surface, refurbishing the platform shelters and providing new lighting, fencing, seating and bins.

During the 2011 conversion of the broad gauge line to standard gauge, all remaining sidings were disconnected. The station now has no loop or non-platform tracks, and essentially is now only a "through" station.

Former stations Winton and Glenrowan were located between Wangaratta and Benalla, while former station Bowser was located between Wangaratta and Springhurst.

Platforms and services

Wangaratta has two side platforms. However, only one is in use due to the Inland Rail project, with upgrade works to start in late 2021.

It is serviced by V/Line Albury line services, and NSW TrainLink XPT Sydney to Melbourne services.

Platform 1
 V/Line services to Southern Cross and Albury
 XPT services to Southern Cross and Sydney Central

Platform 2
No passenger service using Platform 2 until further notice. It has, however, been used on the occasion if works are occurring on the main platform.

Transport links

Fallons Wangaratta operates two routes via Wangaratta station, under contract to Public Transport Victoria:
: Wangaratta – West End
: Wangaratta – Yarrawonga Road

V/Line operate road coach services from Wangaratta station to Bendigo, Corowa, Bright and Beechworth.

Gallery

References

External links
Victorian Railway Stations gallery

Railway stations in Australia opened in 1873
Regional railway stations in Victoria (Australia)
Wangaratta
Listed railway stations in Australia
Victorian Heritage Register Hume (region)
Rural City of Wangaratta